David Rolfe may refer to:

 David Rolfe (swimmer) (1964–2015), Paralympic swimming and paracanoe competitor from Australia
 David Rolfe (singer) (born 1968), American singer